Downtown Chilhowie Historic District is a national historic district located at Chilhowie, Smyth County, Virginia. The district includes 11 contributing buildings in the central business district of Chilhowie. These commercial buildings were largely constructed after a fire in 1909 destroyed the commercial block.  Notable buildings include the Chilhowie Hardware Company (1909), the Beaux-Arts style National Bank of Chilhowie (1909), Chilhowie Drug Company (1916), Bonham Motor Company (c. 1920), and Southern Air Restaurant (1947).

It was listed on the National Register of Historic Places in 2000.

References

Commercial buildings on the National Register of Historic Places in Virginia
Historic districts in Smyth County, Virginia
Beaux-Arts architecture in Virginia
Commercial buildings completed in 1909
National Register of Historic Places in Smyth County, Virginia
Historic districts on the National Register of Historic Places in Virginia